Basmenj (also Romanized as Bāsmenj; also known as Bāsmej and Bāsmīnj) is a city in the Central District of Tabriz County, East Azerbaijan province, Iran. At the 2006 census, its population was 10,736 in 2,873 households. The following census in 2011 counted 11,190 people in 3,283 households. The latest census in 2016 showed a population of 12,692 people in 3,890 households.

References 

Tabriz County

Cities in East Azerbaijan Province

Populated places in East Azerbaijan Province

Populated places in Tabriz County